Amak Island is an uninhabited island in Aleutians East Borough, Alaska, United States. The island lies north of the western tip of the Alaska Peninsula, and northwest of the mainland city of Cold Bay. The island's volcano, Mount Amak, last erupted in 1796.

The local population of the song sparrow was last seen on the island around New Year's Eve, 1980/1981, and has not been seen since; devegetation of the island played a part in its demise. These birds were formerly considered a separate subspecies, Melospiza melodia amaka, but are now considered to fall into the range of variation of the Aleutian song sparrow (M. m. sanaka). Unconfirmed reports from the late 1980s suggest that the island, should habitat quality improve, would in time be recolonized by the species.

References

Further reading
United States Census Bureau (2000): Amak Island: Block 1071, Census Tract 1, Aleutians East Borough, Alaska

Islands of the Aleutian Islands
Islands of Aleutians East Borough, Alaska
Uninhabited islands of Alaska
Islands of Alaska